New Mill Pond is a lake in Smithtown on the Northeast Branch River in Suffolk County, New York and is used for recreational purposes. Construction was completed in 1825. It is owned by Suffolk County  Parks Department.

New Mill Pond Dam is of earthen construction.

References

http://www.dec.ny.gov/outdoor/24154.html

External links
 http://findlakes.com/new_mill_pond_new-york~ny01516.htm

Lakes of New York (state)
Smithtown, New York
Lakes of Suffolk County, New York